Yogurt (from , also spelled yoghurt, yogourt or yoghourt) is a food produced by bacterial fermentation of milk. The bacteria used to make yogurt are known as yogurt cultures. Fermentation of sugars in the milk by these bacteria produces lactic acid, which acts on milk protein to give yogurt its texture and characteristic tart flavor. Cow's milk is the milk most commonly used to make yogurt. Milk from water buffalo, goats, ewes, mares, camels, and yaks are also used to produce yogurt. The milk used may be homogenized or not. It may be pasteurized or raw. Each type of milk produces substantially different results.

Yogurt is produced using a culture of Lactobacillus delbrueckii subsp. bulgaricus and Streptococcus thermophilus bacteria. In addition, other lactobacilli and bifidobacteria are sometimes added during or after culturing yogurt. Some countries require yogurt to contain a specific amount of colony-forming units (CFU) of bacteria; in China, for example, the requirement for the number of lactobacillus bacteria is at least 1 million CFU per milliliter.

To produce yogurt, milk is first heated, usually to about 85 °C (185 °F), to denature the milk proteins so that they do not form curds. After heating, the milk is allowed to cool to about 45 °C (113 °F). The bacterial culture is mixed in, and a warm temperature of 30–45 °C (86–113 °F) is maintained for 4 to 12 hours to allow fermentation to occur, with the higher temperatures working faster but risking a lumpy texture or whey separation.

Etymology and spelling
The sound ğ was traditionally rendered as "gh" in transliterations of Turkish from around 1615–1625.

In English, spelling variations include yogurt, yoghurt, and to a lesser extent yoghourt or yogourt. In the United Kingdom, the word is usually spelled yoghurt while in the United States the spelling is yogurt. In Australia, New Zealand and South Africa, both spellings are commonly found. Canada has its own spelling, yogourt, a minority variant of the French , although yogurt and  yoghurt are also used.

History
Analysis of the L. delbrueckii subsp. bulgaricus genome indicates that the bacterium may have originated on the surface of a plant. Milk may have become spontaneously and unintentionally exposed to it through contact with plants, or bacteria may have been transferred from the udder of domestic milk-producing animals. The origins of yogurt are unknown, but it was probably invented by Neolithic people in Central Asia and Mesopotamia  around 5000 BC, when the first milk-producing animals were domesticated. They most likely found out how to ferment milk by chance and in all likelihood, yogurt was discovered independently in this way in many different places at different times.

The cuisine of ancient Greece included a dairy product known as oxygala which was a form of yogurt. Galen (AD 129 – c. 200/c. 216) mentioned that oxygala was consumed with honey, similar to the way thickened Greek yogurt is eaten today. The oldest writings mentioning yogurt are attributed to Pliny the Elder, who remarked that certain "barbarous nations" knew how "to thicken the milk into a substance with an agreeable acidity". The use of yogurt by medieval Turks is recorded in the books Dīwān Lughāt al-Turk by Mahmud Kashgari and Kutadgu Bilig by Yusuf Has Hajib written in the 11th century. Both texts mention the word "yogurt" in different sections and describe its use by nomadic Turks. The earliest yogurts were probably spontaneously fermented by wild bacteria in goat skin bags.

Some accounts suggest that Mughal Indian emperor Akbar's cooks would flavor yogurt with mustard seeds and cinnamon. Another early account of a European encounter with yogurt occurs in French clinical history: Francis I suffered from a severe diarrhea which no French doctor could cure. His ally Suleiman the Magnificent sent a doctor, who allegedly cured the patient with yogurt. Being grateful, the French king spread around the information about the food that had cured him.

Until the 1900s, yogurt was a staple in diets of people in the Russian Empire (and especially Central Asia and the Caucasus), Western Asia, South Eastern Europe/Balkans, Central Europe, and the Indian subcontinent. Stamen Grigorov (1878–1945), a Bulgarian student of medicine in Geneva, first examined the microflora of the Bulgarian yogurt. In 1905, he described it as consisting of a spherical and a rod-like lactic acid-producing bacteria. In 1907, the rod-like bacterium was called Bacillus bulgaricus (now Lactobacillus delbrueckii subsp. bulgaricus). The Russian biologist and Nobel laureate Ilya Mechnikov, from the Institut Pasteur in Paris, was influenced by Grigorov's work and hypothesized that regular consumption of yogurt was responsible for the unusually long lifespans of Bulgarian peasants. Believing Lactobacillus to be essential for good health, Mechnikov worked to popularize yogurt as a foodstuff throughout Europe.

Isaac Carasso industrialized the production of yogurt. In 1919, Carasso, who was from Ottoman Salonika, started a small yogurt business in Barcelona, Spain, and named the business Danone ("little Daniel") after his son. The brand later expanded to the United States under an Americanized version of the name: Dannon. Yogurt with added fruit jam was patented in 1933 by the Radlická Mlékárna dairy in Prague.

Yogurt was introduced to the United States in the first decade of the twentieth century, influenced by Élie Metchnikoff's The Prolongation of Life; Optimistic Studies (1908); it was available in tablet form for those with digestive intolerance and for home culturing. It was popularized by John Harvey Kellogg at the Battle Creek Sanitarium, where it was used both orally and in enemas, and later by Armenian immigrants Sarkis and Rose Colombosian, who started "Colombo and Sons Creamery" in Andover, Massachusetts, in 1929.

Colombo Yogurt was originally delivered around New England in a horse-drawn wagon inscribed with the Armenian word "madzoon" which was later changed to "yogurt", the Turkish language name of the product, as Turkish was the lingua franca between immigrants of the various Near Eastern ethnicities who were the main consumers at that time. Yogurt's popularity in the United States was enhanced in the 1950s and 1960s, when it was presented as a health food by scientists like Hungarian-born bacteriologist Stephen A. Gaymont. Plain yogurt still proved too sour for the American palate and in 1966 Colombo Yogurt sweetened the yogurt and added fruit preserves, creating "fruit on the bottom" style yogurt. This was successful and company sales soon exceeded $1 million per year. By the late 20th century, yogurt had become a common American food item and Colombo Yogurt was sold in 1993 to General Mills, which discontinued the brand in 2010.

Market and consumption

In 2017, the average American ate  of yogurt. The average consumption of yogurt has been declining since 2014.

Sale of yogurt was down 3.4 percent over the 12 months ending in February 2019. The decline of Greek-style yogurt has allowed Icelandic skyr to gain a foothold in the United States with sales of the latter increasing 24 percent in 2018 to $173 million.

Nutrition

Yogurt (plain yogurt from whole milk) is 81% water, 9% protein, 5% fat, and 4% carbohydrates, including 4% sugars (table). A 100-gram amount provides  of dietary energy. As a proportion of the Daily Value (DV), a serving of yogurt is a rich source of vitamin B12 (31% DV) and riboflavin (23% DV), with moderate content of protein, phosphorus, and selenium (14 to 19% DV; table).

  
Tilde (~) represents missing or incomplete data. 
The above shows little difference exists between whole milk and yogurt made from whole milk with respect to the listed nutritional constituents.

Health research

Because it may contain live cultures, yogurt is often associated with probiotics, which have been postulated as having positive effects on immune, cardiovascular or metabolic health.

As of the early 21st century, high-quality clinical evidence was insufficient to conclude that consuming yogurt lowers the risk of diseases or otherwise improves health. Meta-analyses found that consuming 80 grams per day of low-fat yogurt was associated with a lower risk of developing type 2 diabetes and a lower incidence of hip fracture in post-menopausal women. A 2021 review found a cause-and-effect relationship between yogurt consumption and improved lactose tolerance and digestion, and that potential associations exist between yogurt consumption and improving bone health, as well as lowering the risk of some diseases, including cancers and metabolic syndrome.

Safety
Yogurt made with raw milk can be contaminated with bacteria that can cause significant illness and even result in death, including Listeria, Cryptosporidium, Campylobacter, Brucella, Escherichia coli and Salmonella. Yogurts can also be contaminated with aflatoxin-producing Aspergillus flavus, Aspergillus parasiticus and Aspergillus nomius.

Contamination occurs in traditionally prepared yogurts more often than industrially processed ones, but may affect the latter as well if manufacturing and packaging practices are suboptimal.

When mold forms on yogurt it can not be scraped away. The consistency of yogurt allows the mold to penetrate deeply under the surface where it spreads.

Varieties and presentation

Dahi is a yogurt from the Indian subcontinent, known for its characteristic taste and consistency. The word dahi seems to be derived from the Sanskrit word dadhi ("sour milk"), one of the five elixirs, or panchamrita, often used in Hindu ritual. Sweetened dahi (mishti doi or meethi dahi) is common in eastern parts of India, made by fermenting sweetened milk. While cow's milk is currently the primary ingredient for yogurt, goat and buffalo milk were widely used in the past, and valued for the fat content (see buffalo curd).

Dadiah or dadih is a traditional West Sumatran yogurt made from water buffalo milk, fermented in bamboo tubes. Yogurt is common in Nepal, where it is served as both an appetizer and dessert. Locally called dahi, it is a part of the Nepali culture, used in local festivals, marriage ceremonies, parties, religious occasions, family gatherings, and so on. One Nepalese yogurt is called juju dhau, originating from the city of Bhaktapur. In Tibet, yak milk (technically dri milk, as the word yak refers to the male animal) is made into yogurt (and butter and cheese) and consumed.

In Northern Iran, Mâst Chekide is a variety of kefir yogurt with a distinct sour taste. It is usually mixed with a pesto-like water and fresh herb purée called delal. Common appetizers are spinach or eggplant borani, Mâst-o-Khiâr with cucumber, spring onions and herbs, and Mâst-Musir with wild shallots. In the summertime, yogurt and ice cubes are mixed together with cucumbers, raisins, salt, pepper and onions and topped with some croutons made of Persian traditional bread and served as a cold soup. Ashe-Mâst is a warm yogurt soup with fresh herbs, spinach and lentils. Even the leftover water extracted when straining yogurt is cooked to make a sour cream sauce called kashk, which is usually used as a topping on soups and stews.

Matsoni is a Georgian yogurt in the Caucasus and Russia. They are made with ayran, cucumbers, dill, salt, olive oil, and optionally garlic and ground walnuts. Tzatziki in Greece and milk salad in Bulgaria are thick yogurt-based salads similar to tarator.

Khyar w Laban (cucumber and yogurt salad) is a dish in Lebanon and Syria. Also, a wide variety of local Lebanese and Syrian dishes are cooked with yogurt like "Kibbi bi Laban" Rahmjoghurt, a creamy yogurt with much higher fat content (10%) than many yogurts offered in English-speaking countries. Dovga, a yogurt soup cooked with a variety of herbs and rice, is served warm in winter or refreshingly cold in summer. Jameed, yogurt salted and dried to preserve it, is consumed in Jordan. Zabadi is the type of yogurt made in Egypt, usually from the milk of the Egyptian water buffalo. It is particularly associated with Ramadan fasting, as it is thought to prevent thirst during all-day fasting.

Sweetened and flavored

To offset its natural sourness, yogurt is also sold sweetened, sweetened and flavored or in containers with fruit or fruit jam on the bottom. The two styles of yogurt commonly found in the grocery store are set-style yogurt and Swiss-style yogurt. Set-style yogurt is poured into individual containers to set, while Swiss-style yogurt is stirred prior to packaging. Either may have fruit added to increase sweetness.

Lassi is a common Indian beverage made from stirred liquified yogurt that is either salted or sweetened with sugar commonly, less commonly honey and combined with fruit pulp to create flavored lassi. Consistency can vary widely, with urban and commercial lassis having uniform texture through being processed, whereas rural and rustic lassi has discernible curds or fruit pulp.

Large amounts of sugar – or other sweeteners for low-energy yogurts – are often used in commercial yogurt. Some yogurts contain added modified starch, pectin (found naturally in fruit) or gelatin to create thickness and creaminess. This type of yogurt may be marketed under the name Swiss-style, although it is unrelated to conventional Swiss yogurt. Some yogurts, often called "cream line", are made with whole milk which has not been homogenized so the cream rises to the top. In many countries, sweetened, flavored yogurt is common, typically sold in single-serving plastic cups. Common flavors may include vanilla, honey, and toffee, and various fruits. In the early 21st century, yogurt flavors inspired by desserts, such as chocolate or cheesecake, became common. There is concern about the health effects of sweetened yogurt due to its high sugar content, although research indicates that use of sugar in yogurt manufacturing has decreased since 2016 in response to WHO and government initiatives to combat obesity.

Straining

Strained yogurt has been strained through a filter, traditionally made of muslin and more recently of paper or non-muslin cloth. This removes the whey, giving a much thicker consistency. Strained yogurt is made at home, especially if using skimmed milk which results in a thinner consistency. Yogurt that has been strained to filter or remove the whey is known as Labneh in Middle Eastern countries. It has a consistency between that of yogurt and cheese. It may be used for sandwiches in Middle Eastern countries. Olive oil, cucumber slices, olives, and various green herbs may be added. It can be thickened further and rolled into balls, preserved in olive oil, and fermented for a few more weeks. It is sometimes used with onions, meat, and nuts as a stuffing for a variety of pies or kibbeh balls.

Some types of strained yogurts are boiled in open vats first, so that the liquid content is reduced. The East Indian dessert, a variation of traditional dahi called mishti dahi, offers a thicker, more custard-like consistency, and is usually sweeter than western yogurts. In western Indian (Marathi and Gujarati) cuisine, strained yogurt is macerated with sugar and spices such as saffron, cardamom and nutmeg to make the dessert "shrikhand". Strained yogurt is also enjoyed in Greece and is the main component of tzatziki (from Turkish ""), a well-known accompaniment to gyros and souvlaki pita sandwiches: it is a yogurt sauce or dip made with the addition of grated cucumber, olive oil, salt and, optionally, mashed garlic. Srikhand, a dessert in India, is made from strained yogurt, saffron, cardamom, nutmeg and sugar and sometimes fruits such as mango or pineapple.

In North America, strained yogurt is commonly called "Greek yogurt". Powdered milk is sometimes added in lieu of straining to achieve thickness. In Britain as "Greek-style yogurt". In Britain the name "Greek" may only be applied to yogurt made in Greece.

Beverages

Ayran, doogh ("dawghe" in Neo-Aramaic) or dhallë is a yogurt-based, salty drink. It is made by mixing yogurt with water and (sometimes) salt.

Borhani (or burhani) is a spicy yogurt drink from Bangladesh. It is usually served with kacchi biryani at weddings and special feasts. Key ingredients are yogurt blended with mint leaves (mentha), mustard seeds and black rock salt (Kala Namak). Ground roasted cumin, ground white pepper, green chili pepper paste and sugar are often added.

Lassi is a yogurt-based beverage that is usually slightly salty or sweet, and may be commercially flavored with rosewater, mango or other fruit juice. Salty lassi is usually flavored with ground, roasted cumin and red chilies, may be made with buttermilk.

An unsweetened and unsalted yogurt drink usually called simply jogurt is consumed with burek and other baked goods in the Balkans. Sweetened yogurt drinks are the usual form in Europe (including the UK) and the US, containing fruit and added sweeteners. These are typically called "drinkable yogurt". Also available are "yogurt smoothies", which contain a higher proportion of fruit and are more like smoothies.

Production

Yogurt is made by heating milk to a temperature that denaturates its proteins (scalding), essential for making yogurt, cooling it to a temperature that will not kill the live microorganisms that turn the milk into yogurt, inoculating certain bacteria (starter culture), usually Streptococcus thermophilus and Lactobacillus bulgaricus, into the milk, and finally keeping it warm for several hours.

Milk with a higher concentration of solids than normal milk may be used; the higher solids content produces a firmer yogurt. Solids can be increased by adding dried milk. The yogurt-making process provides two significant barriers to pathogen growth, heat and acidity (low pH). Both are necessary to ensure a safe product. Acidity alone has been questioned by recent outbreaks of food poisoning by E. coli O157:H7 that is acid-tolerant. E. coli O157:H7 is easily destroyed by pasteurization (heating); the initial heating of the milk kills pathogens as well as denaturing proteins. The microorganisms that turn milk into yogurt can tolerate higher temperatures than most pathogens, so that a suitable temperature not only encourages the formation of yogurt, but inhibits pathogenic microorganisms. Once the yogurt has formed it can, if desired, be strained to reduce the whey content and thicken it.

Commerce

Two types of yogurt are supported by the Codex Alimentarius for import and export.
 Pasteurized yogurt ("heat treated fermented milk") is yogurt pasteurized to kill bacteria.
 Probiotic yogurt (labeled as "live yogurt" or "active yogurt") is yogurt pasteurized to kill bacteria, with Lactobacillus added in measured units before packaging.
 Yogurt probiotic drink is a drinkable yogurt pasteurized to kill bacteria, with Lactobacillus added before packaging.

Under US Food and Drug Administration regulations, milk must be pasteurized before it is cultured, and may optionally be heat treated after culturing to increase shelf life. Most commercial yogurts in the United States are not heat treated after culturing, and contain live cultures.

Yogurt with live cultures is more beneficial than pasteurized yogurt for people with lactose malabsorption.

Lactose intolerance

Lactose intolerance is a condition in which people have symptoms due to the decreased ability to digest lactose, a sugar found in dairy products. In 2010, the European Food Safety Authority (EFSA) determined that lactose intolerance can be alleviated by ingesting live yogurt cultures (lactobacilli) that are able to digest the lactose in other dairy products. The scientific review by EFSA enabled yogurt manufacturers to use a health claim on product labels, provided that the "yogurt should contain at least 108 CFU live starter microorganisms (Lactobacillus delbrueckii subsp. bulgaricus and Streptococcus thermophilus) per gram. The target population is individuals with lactose maldigestion." A 2021 review found that yogurt consumption could improve lactose tolerance and digestion.

Plant-based products
A variety of plant-based yogurt alternatives appeared in the 2000s, using soy milk, rice milk, and nut milks such as almond milk and coconut milk fermented with cultures. These products may be suitable for people with lactose intolerance or those who prefer plant-based foods such as vegetarians or vegans. Plant-based milks have different structures and components than dairy milk. Though they can be used to make many products similar to those made from dairy, there are differences in taste and texture. For example, "soy, almond, [and] coconut yogurts do not have the same delicate and smooth structure that conventional yogurts have." Since plant-based milks do not contain lactose (the food of Streptococcus thermophilus and Lactobacillus bulgaricus), plant-based products usually contain different bacterial strains than yogurt, such as Lactobacillus casei, Lactobacillus rhamnosus, and Bifidobacterium bifidum. Plant-based products also vary considerably in their nutrition and ingredients, and may contain gums, stabilizers, high-intensity sweeteners, and artificial colors.

In Europe, companies may not market their plant-based products using the word "yogurt" since that term is reserved for products of animal origin only – per European Union regulation 1308/2013 and a 2017 ruling in the Court of Justice of the European Union. Reaffirmed in 2021, per the USA FDA's Standard of Identity regulations, the word "yogurt" has been reserved for a product made from lactation and is a product of "milk-derived ingredients".

Gallery

See also 

 Fermented milk products
 Frozen yogurt
 List of dairy products
 Probiotic
 List of yogurt-based dishes and beverages

References

External links 
 

 
Ancient dishes
Fermented dairy products
Desserts
Sour foods
Bulgarian cuisine
Turkish cuisine
Turkish words and phrases
Convenience foods
Snack foods